Latin Awards Canada is an awards ceremony for music, art, culture, media, personalities and everything about Hispanic entertainment in Canada. This event was created and produced by the animator and producer of radio Mr. Anibal Cruz and is held annually since September 5, 2015.

It aims to reward and recognize the value and success of artists, entrepreneurs, journalists, producers, TV, broad-casters, promoters, DJs, art, film, social networks, dance, culture and Hispanic media in Canada during their last year of work. Special awards are also given to personali-ties, producers, representatives of art, film, dance, culture, media and local and international artists.

The nominations are under the responsibility of the selection committee. The selection is made through surveys in the different areas and is supported by experts who have the skills in the field. The laureates are chosen from the public votes collected on the official page of the event.

In the same way, there is a group of juries with experience and knowledge of the music industry and in other matters depending on the category. The latter will grant an additional note to the nominees, which will be added to the votes received by the public.

History 
Latin Awards Canada, is an initiative of the Dominican producer Anibal Cruz, President of the Cruz-A Foundation, who for almost ten years has directed the Latin programs of the radio station 106.3 FM, which belongs to one of the most important radio groups in all of Canada.

In 2016, Woodbine Mall was the scene of the Latinos Awards, a tribute to nine outstanding Latinos.  All the Hispanic media in Montreal and the rest of Canada gathered at the Symposia Theater to broadcast the Latin Awards Canada event and on the other hand, various artists attended, among other leaders of the Hispanic community.

In 2017, the event was held at the Rialto Theater in Montreal and was attended by former beauty queen Ninela Sánchez and radio host Janeiro Matos as hosts for the night.  This year, Traccos Solutions, a commercial branch of Traccos Films dedicated to capturing live broadcast and webcast shows, closed an agreement with the Cruz-A Foundation for the audiovisual production of the third installment of the Latin Awards Canada.

The fourth edition of the Canada Latin Awards was held in 2018 again at the Rialto Theater. International singers traveled to this event, such as Pedro Fernández (Mexico), Elvis Martinez “El Jefe” (Dominican Republic), Tommy Titerito (Dominican Republic), Eliades Ochoa (Cuba) and Etienne Drapeau (Canada).

On December 27, 2020, the sixth edition of the Latin Awards Canada was held in Montreal under strict security measures due to Covid-19.

The 8th edition of Latin Awards Canada was broadcast live on Urbana TV FM and retransmitted via radio and television by all its official radio and television channels: Urbana TV, Fuego TV, Tele Canal 29; Tropical Moon TV Hip Radiate HCSH AND TV.dreamforcebtl for Panama, Ecuador, Costa Rica and Peru.

Nominees Selection and Winners Election 
The public votes by phone, text message and through a ballot box to cast their votes to choose their favorite nominees. Likewise, an association of artists, allies of independent communicators and members of Latin Awards Canada will be able to choose and vote for the candidates.

Categories

Artists 

 Arranger or producer of the year
 Composer of the year
 Arranger or urban producer of the year
 Singer duo or urban group abroad
 Singer of the year
 Singer of the year
 Revelation Artist of the Year
 Public Artist of the Year (popular vote)
 Christian Artist of the Year
 Most popular Latino Artist of the Year in Canada
 International Artists

Radio Diffuser 

 Best radio program
 Best radio host
 Best internet radio
 Best animator on stage
 Festivals and Events Promoters
 Event Producer of the Year
 Event promoter of the year
 Disco Club Promoters of the Year
 Festival of the year

DJ 

 Contemporary DJ of the year
 Dj Urbain (young) of the year

Journalist 

 Journalist of the year
 Informative digital media of the year
 Journal of the year

Dance and culture 

 Cultural Folk Group and Dance of the Year
 Best Director / Producer TV Movie
 Best Classical Photographer
 Other

See also

References

External links
 

2015 establishments in the United States
American music awards
Awards established in 2015
Performing arts trophies
Recurring events established in 2015